Since the 1990s, several mass poisonings from toxic cough syrup have occurred in developing countries. In these cases, an ingredient in cough syrup, glycerine (glycerol), was replaced with diethylene glycol, a cheaper alternative to glycerine for industrial applications. Diethylene glycol is nephrotoxic and can result in multiple organ dysfunction syndrome (MODS), especially in children.

History
There have been poisonings in Panama, China, Haiti, Bangladesh, Argentina, Nigeria, India (twice), Indonesia, Uzbekistan and The Gambia between 1992 and 2022, due to contaminated cough syrup and other medications that incorporated inexpensive diethylene glycol instead of glycerine.

Bangladesh
Discovering and tracing a toxic syrup to its source has been difficult for health care providers and governmental agencies due to difficult communication between the governments of developed countries and developing countries. For example, Michael L. Bennish, an American pediatrician who works in developing countries, had been volunteering in Bangladesh as a physician and had noticed a number of deaths that seemed to coincide with the distribution of the government-issued cough syrup. The government rebuffed his attempts at investigating the medication. In response, Bennish smuggled bottles of the syrup in his suitcase when returning to the United States, allowing pharmaceutical laboratories in Massachusetts to identify the poisonous diethylene glycol, which can appear very similar to the less dangerous glycerine. Bennish went on to author a 1995 article in the British Medical Journal about his experience, writing that, given the amount of medication prescribed, death tolls "must [already] be in the tens of thousands".

Indonesia 
In 2022, deaths of nearly 100 children in Indonesia, were reported to be linked to cough syrup and liquid medication. The syrup contained "unacceptable amounts" of diethylene glycol and ethylene glycol, linked to acute kidney injuries (AKI). In October, health officials reported around 200 cases of AKI in children, most of who were aged under five. Indonesia temporarily banned the sale and prescription of all syrup and liquid medicines as it was not clear if these medicines were imported or locally produced.

Panama
In May 2007, 365 deaths were reported in Panama.

In Panama, the imported diethylene glycol came from a Chinese manufacturer. The China Food and Drug Administration did not regard the toxic cough syrup scandal as being China's fault. The Chinese manufacturer exported the diethylene glycol under the name TD glycerine, but the Spanish middleman Aduanas Javier de Gracia changed the name to glycerine when he filled the customs declaration in Panama.

The Gambia 
In October 2022, the WHO announced a link between four paediatric cough syrups from one Indian pharmaceutical company and the deaths of 66 children in The Gambia from kidney failure. The products (Promethazine Oral Solution, Kofexmalin Baby Cough Syrup, Makoff Baby Cough Syrup, and Magrip N Cold Syrup) are believed to be contaminated with diethylene glycol and/or ethylene glycol. The products involved were manufactured by Maiden Pharmaceuticals in December 2021.

This has led to Maiden Pharmaceuticals' products being banned in The Gambia; a probe by the CDSCO and volunteers from health agencies in The Gambia going door to door in an urgent recall.

In December 2022, a parliamentary committee in The Gambia recommended prosecution of the Indian company, Maiden Pharmaceuticals. It also recommended banning all products by the firm in the country.

Uzbekistan 

In December 2022, Uzbekistan's health ministry said that 18 children died from renal problems and acute respiratory disease after drinking cough syrup manufactured by Indian drug maker Marion Biotech. The statement did not specify over what time period the deaths occurred. As a result, Marion Biotech, was suspended from Pharmexcil, an Indian government-linked trade group. As a result, state security police in Uzbekistan arrested four people.

See also
List of medicine contamination incidents

References

2007 in Panama
2007 health disasters
Medical scandals
Health in Panama
Antitussives
Drug safety
Health disasters in North America
Adulteration
Mass poisoning
2022 in Indonesia
2022 in Uzbekistan
2022 health disasters
2022 in the Gambia